The Viceroy of Min-Zhe, fully referred to in Chinese as the Governor-General of Taiwan, Fujian and Zhejiang Provinces and Surrounding Areas Overseeing Military Affairs and Food Production, Manager of Waterways, Director of Civil Affairs, was one of eight Viceroys in China proper during the Qing dynasty. The "Zhe" refers to Zhejiang Province while "Min" is the abbreviation of Fujian Province. Taiwan was also under the Viceroy's control until after the 1895 Treaty of Shimonoseki.

History
The office of Viceroy of Min-Zhe was created under the name "Viceroy of Zhe-Min" in 1645 during the reign of the Shunzhi Emperor. At the time of its creation, its headquarters were in Fuzhou, Fujian Province. In 1648, the headquarters shifted to Quzhou, Zhejiang Province. About 10 years later, the office split into the Viceroy of Fujian and Viceroy of Zhejiang, which were respectively based in Zhangzhou and Wenzhou.

In 1672, during the reign of the Kangxi Emperor, the office of the Viceroy of Fujian shifted from Zhangzhou back to Fuzhou. In 1687, the Viceroy of Fujian was renamed "Viceroy of Min-Zhe".

In 1727, the Yongzheng Emperor specially appointed Li Wei as Viceroy of Zhejiang. The Viceroy of Min-Zhe, on the other hand, was in charge of only Fujian. The two offices were merged under "Viceroy of Min-Zhe" in 1734.

In 1736, the Qianlong Emperor restored the earlier system by appointing Ji Zengyun (嵇曾筠) as the Viceroy of Zhejiang, managing only Zhejiang. Hao Yulin (郝玉麟), the Viceroy of Min-Zhe, was in charge of only Fujian. These changes were reversed in 1738 after the Qianlong Emperor recalled Ji Zengyun back to the imperial capital, leaving Hao Yulin in charge of both Zhejiang and Fujian.

In 1885, during the reign of the Guangxu Emperor, the office of Provincial Governor of Fujian was merged into the office of the Viceroy of Min-Zhe.

In 1911, the last Viceroy of Minzhe Songshou was overthrown and killed by soldiers in mutiny during the Xinhai revolution.

List of Viceroys of Min-Zhe

Related topics 
History of Taiwan
History of Fujian
History of Zhejiang

References

 

 
1656 establishments in China